The 39 Clues is a series of adventure novels written by a collaboration of authors, including Rick Riordan, Gordon Korman, Peter Lerangis, Jude Watson, Patrick Carman, Linda Sue Park, Margaret Peterson Haddix, Roland Smith, David Baldacci, Jeff Hirsch, Natalie Standiford, C. Alexander London, Sarwat Chadda and Jenny Goebel. It consists of five series, The Clue Hunt, Cahills vs. Vespers, Unstoppable, Doublecross, and Superspecial.  They chronicle the adventures of two siblings, Amy and Dan Cahill, who discover that their family, the Cahills, have been and still are, the most influential family in history. 

The first story arc concerns Dan and Amy's quest to find the 39 Clues, which are ingredients to a serum that can create the most powerful person on Earth. This series' primary audience is age 9–14. Since the release of the first novel, The Maze of Bones, on September 9, 2008, the books have gained popularity, positive reception, and commercial success. , the book series has about 8.5 million copies in print and has been translated into 24 languages. 

The publisher of the books is Scholastic Press in the United States. Steven Spielberg acquired film rights to the series in June 2008, and a film based on the books was set to be released in 2016 but production has not yet started as of February 2023. The series also originated tie-in merchandise, including collectible cards and an interactive Internet game.

The 39 Clues

The first series revolves around orphans Amy and Dan Cahill, who discover upon their grandmother's death that the Cahill family has shaped most of world history. Amy and Dan pursue the Clues while evading the sabotage of other Cahills. Each book chronicles one location which Amy, Dan, and their au pair Nellie Gomez travel to and focuses on one historical character associated with a Clue.

The Maze of Bones

The Maze of Bones is the first book in the series, written by Rick Riordan and published on September 9, 2008.

Amy and Dan's grandmother, Grace Cahill, changes her will shortly before her death. At her funeral, her lawyer, William McIntyre, tells Dan, Amy, and their other relatives, of a choice between one million dollars and a chance to participate in the Clue hunt. Amy and Dan enter the Clue hunt, competing against more experienced Clue hunters: the Holt family, Alistair Oh, the Starling Triplets, the Kabras, Jonah Wizard, and Irina Spasky. Dan, Amy and Alistair Oh find a hidden library in Grace's house. The mansion shortly burns down due to the Holts. Fortunately, the Cahills and Alistair make it out on time along with Saladin, Grace's cat.  Pursuing the clue hidden in Grace's library leads to the Franklin Institute. Then the Starling Triplets are seriously injured by the Holts, who had tried to kill Amy and Dan Cahill. There, Dan and Amy discover Benjamin Franklin has hidden a clue in Paris. After convincing their au pair, Nellie, to chaperone their trip, Amy and Dan travel to Paris, where they follow a trail of cyphers and traps that lead them to the catacombs under the city. There they find the co-ordinates for the old church etched into skulls. At an old church, they find a wall painting of the four Cahill ancestors- Luke, Jane, Katherine and Thomas. They also find the clue wrapped around a vial of serum. Then Ian Kabra steals the vial. Amy manages to hide the paper with Dan. After a bit of brainstorming, Dan solves the puzzle and discovers the clue: "iron solute", an anagram for the word "resolution". There is also a secret piece of sheet music. Amy's internet searches lead to the probable location of the second Clue: Vienna, the home of the famous Austrian composer Wolfgang Amadeus Mozart.

One False Note

One False Note, the second book in the series,  was written by Gordon Korman and published on December 2, 2008.

En route to Vienna, the Holts try to steal the lead to the second clue from Amy, Dan, and Nellie, only to find it torn to shreds by Saladin. Luckily, Dan had already stored it in his photographic memory, and he copies it down on a tissue after they leave. They go to Mozart's house and then sneak down to the library to find the diary of Mozart's sister, Maria Anna "Nannerl" Mozart, only to discover that Jonah Wizard has stolen it, luckily they steal the diary back. The diary leads them to Salzburg, Mozart's birthplace, but their search there ends when an explosion causes a cave-in. Amy and Dan think it was caused by the mysterious man in black, who has been at every major disaster that has happened to them. However, they later find out that the explosion was caused by Alistair Oh. In revenge for this, they put a tracker which had been planted on Saladin into Alistair's cane, while he was sleeping. Dan, Amy, and Nellie then go to Venice, where Dan and Amy sneak into the Janus stronghold and steal a very important lead from the Janus and escape, only to be kidnapped by the Kabras later. The Kabras let them go, finding nothing on them. Luckily, Dan and Amy had hidden the lead in a pillow on a boat shortly before being kidnapped by the Kabras. They retrieve the lead and sneak into a museum. Ian and Natalie Kabra attack them and play Mozart's first harpsichord with the clue, which is a few pages from Nannerl's diary that were cut out. However, the fifth note triggers a booby trap that knocks Ian out. Natalie gets hit with a dart from her dart gun that Dan throws at her. He and Amy find the second clue, tungsten by playing the piece correctly, a pair of Japanese swords, a hint for their next destination.The story continues in the next book

The Sword Thief

The Sword Thief is the third book in the series. It was written by Peter Lerangis and published on March 3, 2009.

A pair of tungsten swords from Venice leads Amy, Dan, and Nellie to Japan for a clue related to Japanese warrior Toyotomi Hideyoshi. Teaming up with Alistair Oh and the Kabras, the three follow a trail of clues to Korea, where they stay at Alistair's house. The Kabras have an interesting coin which they think might be a clue. A book in Alistair's secret library leads them to a mountain called Pukhansan. The group finds an entrance to a cave that uses the coin and hides Hideyoshi's treasure, and the third clue, gold. Dan decodes an anagram and tricks the Kabras, who escape and seal everyone else in the cave. Alistair is presumed to be dead, but turns out he faked it. After escaping, Dan, Amy, and Nellie head for Egypt, as hinted in the anagram.

Beyond the Grave

Beyond the Grave is the fourth book in the series. It was written by Jude Watson and published on June 2, 2009.

Dan, Amy, and Nellie arrive in the Hotel Excelsior, a stronghold bought by Bae Oh, Alistair's uncle. Bae finds them in the hotel's stronghold and traps them. Nellie finds them and sets them free with the help of Saladin. Jonah Wizard later traps them in a deserted island on the Nile. Some local fishermen save them and return them to Egypt. They find the fourth clue, half a gram of myrrh, through a Sakhet statue Grace left them. They barely escape with Nellie and their cat Saladin's help in the search.

The Black Circle

The Black Circle is the fifth book in the series. It was written by Patrick Carman and published on August 11, 2009.

After receiving a telegram from the mysterious "NRR", Dan and Amy leave for Russia. Upon their arrival, another hint from NRR leads them to a credit card and false passports belonging to their dead parents. NRR states she is Nataliya Ruslanova Radova, the daughter of the last Romanov, a Cahill. She escaped to live with a low profile. A blood disorder stops her from joining the Clue hunt. Amy finds Ian Kabra again, and they fall in love. Amy and Dan make an alliance with the Holts, and discover a stronghold. It reveals the next clue, Amber.

In Too Deep

In Too Deep is the sixth book in the series. It was written by Jude Watson (who also wrote Beyond the Grave) and published on November 3, 2009.

Dan and Amy head to Sydney, Australia, to learn about what their parents knew about the 39 Clues from their dad's cousin, Shepard Trent. They discover that Ian and Natalie's mother, Isabel Kabra, has joined the hunt. Isabel tries to feed Amy to sharks, but Hamilton Holt foils her plot. The siblings survive Isabel's second assassination attempt and follow a clue to Krakatau (the ring of fire), where they meet Alistair. Isabel sets fire to their hut. Irina Spasky dies while saving Amy, Dan and Alistair. After the fire, Alistair shows Dan and Amy a message by Robert Cahill Henderson, revealing the clue, water. Near the end of the book, they suspect that Nellie is spying on them for someone else.

The Viper's Nest

The Viper's Nest is the seventh book in the series. It was written by Peter Lerangis and published on February 2, 2010.

The morning after the fire that killed Irina Spasky, Dan and Amy discover that Irina's last words are a song, which points them to their next destination: Pretoria, South Africa. They infiltrate a Tomas stronghold, and the Holts chase them. They think the clue is diamond and so does the Kabras. As Dan and Amy leave South Africa, the Kabras capture them. Flying Grace's old plane The Flying Lemur, the siblings escape with a vial of green liquid. During a quarrel, the vial breaks, and the green liquid, a Kabra poison, spills onto Dan's arm. To save Dan, they fly to Grace Cahill's home in Madagascar, where they find out that the clue is aloe and their parents were Madrigals, an organization Amy and Dan have learned to fear, meaning that they themselves are Madrigals.

The Emperor's Code

The Emperor's Code is the eighth book in the series. It was written by Gordon Korman and published on April 6, 2010.

Amy and Dan go to China to find the next clue. After searching for clues in Tiananmen Square, they split up following an argument. Dan eventually works together with Jonah and visit the Shaolin Monastery, and the Terracotta Army in search of clues, but Dan leaves his temporary alliance with Jonah after his mother, Cora Wizard, leader of the Janus, gets involved. During this confrontation with Cora, Dan accidentally reveals to the Wizards that he and Amy are Madrigals. Meanwhile, Nellie and Amy search the Great Wall of China for clues. Dan and Amy reunite in Tingri, China, and fly up to Mount Everest in an experimental helicopter where they find a Janus vial left by British mountaineer George Mallory. They battle Eisenhower Holt and Ian Kabra over a partial serum. Ian falls, and Amy sacrifices the serum to save him. When Dan thinks they have lost the clue, Amy shows him the poem on a silk fabric they found in Beijing and tells him the next clue is raw silkworm secretion. They realize that a formula on the silk means that four partial serums add up to one master serum. Dan shows Amy the locket he found at a Shaolin temple, which contains an inscription of the name of the pirate Anne Bonnie. They decide their next destination is the Caribbean.

Storm Warning

Storm Warning is the ninth book in the series. It was written by Linda Sue Park and published on May 25, 2010.

Amy and Dan continue their hunt in the Bahamas and Jamaica. They distrust Nellie after discovering that she works for William McIntyre. First, they go to Oceanus, an amusement park in the Bahamas. Dan enjoys all of the rides for two hours, and he meets up with Nellie and Amy seven minutes after two p.m. Amy tells Dan about the Jolly Codger Pirate's Cove Tour, which takes tourists on a boat to islands frequented by famous pirates. Amy and Dan reluctantly agree when Nellie says that she is going with them. When the tour docks at a cove, the first mate gives Amy and Dan a piece of paper with a message on it. They decode it and find out that is says " EAST END OF ISLAND. CAVE.". Meanwhile, Natalie Kabra recounts how she had been experiencing nightmares for a week about Dan and Amy almost dying while being pushed to a propeller by her mother Isabel, and there is no sound except for laughter. The Cahills find a Tomas bear claw in the cave. However, Amy is injured when the tide comes in and she hits her head on rocks. Soon, the group decides to head out of the Bahamas to Jamaica. At the Montego Bay airport, they find a hotel and settle in. Following a lead, they head to Spanish Town, and continue the hunt. They also meet a historian and librarian, Lester, and his grandma, Miss Alice. They learn that Nellie's family has been connected with the Cahills in many ways. They head out to the Port Royal excavation site with Lester, and find a box Grace donated that can fit the objects they collected. They cannot open the box. They are then chased by Isabel's thugs. Lester, who had the box, leads them into quicksand, but gets stuck himself, and drowns. Afterwards, the siblings quit the hunt. Instead of driving them to the airport, Nellie stops at Moore town and gives the box to an infamous "Man In Black", who has been following Dan and Amy, he gives the siblings one hour to open the box. They figure out that on the strip they found is an unfolded Möbius strip. Amy inserts the strip to the final slit and the box springs open. It contains a poem by Madeleine Cahill (the fifth child of Gideon and Olivia Cahill, unbeknownst to all but Olivia) and the clue of mace. The mystery man reveals his true identity as Fiske Cahill, Amy and Dan's grand-uncle and Grace's younger brother. He reveals the existence of the Madrigal branch, a previously unknown part of the Cahill family, and grants them and Nellie active Madrigal status (Nellie was the first person non blood related Madrigal to ever join). After reading the poem, Dan concludes that the siblings' next stop is England.

Into The Gauntlet

Into The Gauntlet is the tenth and penultimate book in the series. It was written by Margaret Peterson Haddix and published on August 31, 2010.

All the Cahills go to the Globe Theater in London and fight over a note. Amy and Dan get most of the note, while others come out with nothing or a little hint. All the teams dig up a grave which leads them to the Cahill island at the home of the founder, Gideon Cahill. They go through a gauntlet with a series of questions for each of the branch members. Isabel Kabra captures them and threatens to kill their loved ones if they do not reveal their clues. She gets them to reveal their clues by threatening their loved ones and makes the serum, but Amy smashes the serum over Isabel's head, knocking her out. The last clue is the serum formula, which Dan memorizes, but no one wants it anymore. Amy and Dan reunite the Cahills, who are all going to have different lives now. They go back to their normal lives, each earning two million dollars.

Vespers Rising

Vespers Rising is the eleventh and final book in the original series, published on April 5, 2011. Rick Riordan, Peter Lerangis, Gordon Korman, and Jude Watson each penned a plot line. 

The first describes Cahill ancestor Gideon's discovery of the master serum and betrayal by his friend and first Vesper, Damien Vesper. The second recounts the life of Gideon's daughter, Madeleine, and her attempt to reunite the Cahill family, protect her father's ring, and outwit Damien Vesper from acquiring it. The third tells of Grace's first mission to Casablanca, as she competes against Vesper agent General George S. Patton to retrieve Gideon's ring. The fourth passage describes Amy and Dan's retrieval of Gideon's ring that Grace bequeathed to Amy, while escaping Casper Wyoming, a Vesper agent.

Cahills vs. Vespers
Cahills vs. Vespers is the second series in The 39 Clues franchise. It revolves around the now united Cahill family fighting the Vespers.

The Medusa Plot

The Medusa Plot is the first book in the series. It was written by Gordon Korman and published on August 30, 2011.

Two years after the Clue hunt, all who succeeded in finding Gideon's serum recipe have united. The feud between the Cahills has ended, and the family unites to battle a new enemy: the Vespers, a secret organization led by Vesper One who have been the Cahills' enemies since the time of their ancestor Gideon. Members of the Cahill family are kidnapped and will be returned only if Dan and Amy follow Vesper One's instructions. Amy and Dan are instructed by Vesper One to find a painting called the Medusa which leads them to a maze under the Colosseum that was designed by a Janus named Caravaggio, if they fail Vesper One will kill the hostages.

A King's Ransom

A King's Ransom is the second book in the series. It was written by Jude Watson and published on December 6, 2011.

Amy and Dan are in Santa Maria Novella train station in Florence when they come across a girl named Vanessa Mallory, who is Cheyenne Wyoming in disguise, and use her as a distraction to get into the train for Lucerne, Switzerland, where Vesper One is sending them for their next mission: find the De Virga world map. From information translated from German de Virga map archives, Amy concludes that they have to search Neuschwanstein Castle. Amy and Dan find a black notebook owned by Sparrow, a.k.a. Jane Sperling, at the castle. Inside is a note that leads to the de Virga map.

Analysis comes from the Cahill Command Center about the notes: they refer to a Johannes Kepler book recovered from the castle. The Cahills go to the book's current location at the Library of Philosophy and Cosmology in Prague but cannot enter without a reference. After going to Sedlec Ossuary on a hunch from the Command Center, they discover a Vesper One report on a flash drive and the initials AJT, Arthur Josiah Trent, carved on the wall, which shocks Dan because Arthur Josiah Trent was their father. Erasmus, a fellow Cahill, explains that Arthur was initiated into the Vespers but later cut off ties with them. After receiving an email from the library saying they can go, Dan and Amy enter the Library of Philosophy, they bump into Jake and Atticus, who help the siblings. Inside, Katja Mavel, the library director, gives them what they want. They find the map in the book. In Rome, a Vesper dressed like a waiter kills William McIntyre, who leaves a secret message in his shoe before he dies. Back in Prague, Amy and Dan tell Atticus what they are doing, and Atticus reveals his involvement as a Guardian, a separate family allied with the Cahills. Dan connects Il Milione and the map to Samarkand, Uzbekistan - their next destination. Vesper One asks them to drop off the package at the Astronomical Tower, near the statue of Jan Hus. They do, but the Vespers kidnap Atticus, who followed them. Vesper One now knows Dan and Amy have been hiding Marco Polo's epilogue and explains that Atticus was the price of keeping it from him. Minutes later, AJT sends another message to Dan's phone.

The Dead of Night

The Dead of Night is the third book in the series. It was written by Peter Lerangis and published on March 6, 2012.

The Vespers have Atticus Rosenbloom and will kill him if Dan and Amy do not comply with their demands. Vesper One commands Amy and Dan to find a stale orb, an anagram for astrolabe. They fly to Samarkand, Uzbekistan, to find the astrolabe. Atticus escapes, and Dan suspects that his father murdered William McIntyre and is Vesper One. Ian goes to New York, suspecting Isabel to be Vesper One, and Isabel manipulates him into staying by saying that the other Cahills are not his friends. The hostages are rumored to be in Argentina because of a lizard Nellie holds in a photo. Dan has gathered seventeen ingredients of the thirty-nine for his own master serum. He has also been receiving texts from a Vesper claiming to be his father, so he texts back a question to confirm this and is shocked that the answer is correct.

Shatterproof

Shatterproof is the fourth book in the series. It was written by Roland Smith and published on September 4, 2012.

Amy and Dan must steal the Golden Jubilee diamond from Berlin's Pergamon Museum to keep Vesper One from killing a Cahill. The Diamond is too well protected, but they escape from security. Vesper One reveals that they were merely a distraction, and he has what he needs. He tells them to find the "Apology", a Roman article written by a soldier. Jonah, Hamilton, and Erasmus work on tracking down Luna Amato, a Vesper, for information on William McIntyre's murder. Luna kills Erasmus, but Jonah kills her. The hostages try to escape, but the Vespers stop them. Phoenix, a hostage and Jonah Wizard's cousin, falls off a cliff. Before they escape, Casper and Cheyenne inform Amy and Dan of Phoenix's death, causing Amy to blame Ian. Meanwhile, Phoenix is revealed to have survived the fall, and escapes.

Trust No One

Trust No One is the fifth and penultimate book in the series. It was written by Linda Sue Park, the author of Storm Warning, and was published on December 4, 2012. The novel features Isabel and takes place in Brazil.

Vesper One tells Amy and Dan to go to Yale and steal the Voynich Manuscript, Folio 74. Evan finds out that Sinead is Vesper Three. She blocks Evan's messages, but Amy finds out, and the two fight before Sinead flees. Amy then apologizes to Ian, and they find that the folio is missing. After meeting Dave Speminer (a friend of the Rosenblooms' mother, Astrid), Atticus remembers something that his mom said to him before dying: Missing Voynich with LaCher. Vesper One streams a video of Nellie, telling them of Alistair's death. They check Astrid Rosenbloom's email for clues about the folio's location. A coded email directs them to the Iguazu Falls in Brazil. During a capoeira performance, a capoeirista "accidentally" injures Atticus. At the Falls, a second attack occurs, and a blow dart coated with curare hits Dan, but a nearby doctor saves him from the poison. They realize Isabel Kabra orchestrated the attacks and that there will be one more.

A taxi driver takes them to Mabu Thermas Hotel and Spa and sees Dan's new wallpaper on his laptop, one of the "plumbing pictures" in the Voynich. At the spa, they meet LaCher Siffright, who has Folio 74. LaCher protects Atticus from the third attack: a man who throws a knife and a skewer at Atticus. They find the folio and realize that Archimedes plays a part in the Vespers' master plan. They suspect Isabel to be Vesper One and ask Hamilton and Jonah to find out more about Archimedes. Amy is tricked into giving Vesper One Gideon's ring, which Grace entrusted her with. They find out the Vespers' master plan: to build the Machina Fini Mundi, a doomsday device. Traumatized by her betrayal, Amy hides in her own mind, blocking out the real world. Dan decides that the team should go to Attleboro. He believes that to combat a doomsday device, he needs the serum which he recently created, and he drinks an unknown liquid an Ekaterina scientist manufactures.

Day of Doom

Day of Doom is the sixth and final book in the Cahills vs. Vespers series. It is written by David Baldacci and published on March 5, 2013.

Continuing from the last chapter of Trust No One, Dan drinks the "serum" that he made with the help of an Ekaterina scientist, but Amy reveals that she replaced the real serum with a mixture of vegetables. Amy tells Dan that Isabel Kabra is Vesper Two, not Vesper One, and that she is flying to Washington, D.C. Following a clue from Astrid, Amy and Dan go to the National Museum of Natural History, which houses the largest collection of Lewis and Clark items. On the train, Vesper One sends them a video of the hostages. Atticus realizes that Ted is blinking Morse code and decodes the message: Riley McGrath is Vesper One. At the museum, they find out that Isabel wanted to see Lewis and Clark's compass. Dan sees numbers and letters scratched onto the back of the compass. Evan and Ian receive a call from Phoenix from a motel in Washington state and head there with Hamilton and Jonah, whom Sandy, Casper, and Cheyenne follow. Disguised as a waitress, Cheyenne forces them into a van, taking them to the Rocky Mountains. Dan decides to take a train to the Cascade Mountain Range, where they believe the hostages and the Machina Fini Mundi are. Atticus grows suspicious of Dave and finds out that Dave Speminer is an anagram of Damien Vesper, the founder of the Vespers. Dan learns that Isabel had been posing as his father and sending the text messages. Isabel kidnaps Atticus, steals the serum in Dan's bag, and escapes. Amy discovers that Isabel modified the coordinates etched on the compass's reverse. The location of the hostages and the Machina Fini Mundi turns out to be on the Rocky Mountains.

The Vespers move the hostages from the Cascades to the Rockies. En route, the hostages break free and incapacitate Sandy, Casper, and Cheyenne and meet up with Amy, Dan, Atticus, and Jake. They find the Machina Fini Mundi and battle the Vespers. The Vespers fatally shoot Evan, while the device electrocutes and kills Natalie. Amy turns the Machina Fini Mundi into a giant electromagnet. When the Vespers come, the device disarms and electrocutes them. Sandy and Damien arrive and hand out stone weapons. Isabel, having drunk Dan's serum and seeking revenge for her children, arrives and tries to stop Damien from inserting the final piece. The device activates, but Isabel destroys it. Damien melts into the device, causing an explosion, which kills Damien and Isabel. In the aftermath, Amy, Sinead, and Dan discuss how they will return to their normal lives.

Unstoppable
Unstoppable is the third series in The 39 Clues franchise. It was revealed in Publishers Weekly on October 25, 2012. Jude Watson wrote the story arc for the series. The first novel, Nowhere to Run by Jude Watson, was published in 2013, followed by Breakaway by Jeff Hirsch, Countdown by Natalie Standiford, and the last book, Flashpoint by Gordon Korman, in 2014.

Nowhere to Run

Nowhere to Run is the first book in the series. It was written by Jude Watson.

J. Rutherford Pierce, a presidential candidate, attacks Amy and Dan and steals the serum from the safekeeper, Sammy Mourad (a Cahill student who made the serum with Dan in Trust No One), to use its power to conquer the world. Using the serum he makes himself a media empire, which he uses to attack Amy and Dan's reputation. This makes the siblings to go to a safehouse in Ireland where they find a book written by Gideon's wife Olivia, which contains the serum's antidote. Friends and family help Amy and Dan go to Troy where they find six whiskers of an Anatolian leopard, the antidote's first ingredient. Meanwhile, Pierce kidnaps Sammy, as part of his plan to mass-produce the serum and build an army for world domination. Nellie disguises herself as a chemist to be hired by Pierce and rescue Sammy from Trilon Laboratories.

Breakaway

Breakaway is the second book in the series. It was written by Jeff Hirsch.

It documents the continuing struggle between the Cahills and Pierce. It also documents deteriorating relations between the Cahills.

Countdown

Countdown is the third book in the Unstoppable series. It was written by Natalie Standiford. The cover features a broken Mayan artifact, as the book primarily takes place in Tikal, Guatemala.

In London, England, J. Rutherford Pierce meets with the Queen of the United Kingdom. However, his wife Debi Ann curtsies when Pierce told her not to, and Pierce later breaks one of the Queen's teacups while experiencing a tremor due to the serum. He tries to turn the mishap to his favor by saying that the teacup was too old and that it was time that the Queen got new china. However, the Queen is not pleased. Pierce reflects on how the Cahills are his last opponent to world domination, and vows to kill them. 

In Guatemala City, Guatemala, the Cahills and Rosenblooms are at the La Aurora International Airport. However, they see paparazzi who are sent by Pierce who publicize their every move. As they escape, they hear rude remarks from the paparazzi and passengers at the airport alike. They escape to their waiting chopper, and make a close escape. They see that Pierce's soldiers are after them, too; their orders are to kills the Cahills but to make it look like an accident. The soldiers' breath smells like green kale mixed with chlorine and ammonia. 

After the chopper takes off, one of Pierce's men who had taken the serum jumped extremely high. 

The chopper is on its way to Tikal, where the kids have to look for riven crystal in order to complete the antidote to the serum Pierce and his thugs have taken. Dan, Atticus, and Jake are all ignoring Amy because of how she left them behind while embarking on a dangerous mission. 

Amy also told Jake, her ex-boyfriend, that she had never loved him. Amy decides that she would rather have her loved ones "angry and alive than dead".  Amy also hears the clink of the serum that Sammy Mourad had made for her, just in case. As the group discusses the riven crystal and Tikal, a national park and archaeological treasure uncovered in 1956, the chopper suddenly shakes. The pilot, who is wearing a parachute, was bribed by Pierce to jump out and crash the helicopter in an attempt to kill the Cahills. 

The group fights the pilot, and Amy takes the controls. She unsteadily flies it to Tikal, where the chopper falls thirty vertical feet onto a pok-a-tok court. Miraculously, the group survives with few injuries. A ranger picks them up and tells them information about Tikal. At their hotel room, the kids ask Pony to do a search on Debi Ann, who is a Cahill. 

Later, Atticus uses Olivia Cahill's book to find out the location of the riven crystal. Meanwhile, in Trilon Laboratories in Delaware, Nellie Gomez, acting as Nadine Gormey, makes contact with Sammy Mourad, who is being held in the building to improve the serum for Pierce. 

In Attleboro, Massachusetts, Pony works on getting information about Debi Ann, though it is difficult. 

Meanwhile, in Tikal, as the group is searching for the crystal, Pierce's thugs ambush them, and Dan is critically injured. Amy takes the serum in order to save Dan, but now she only has a week to live. In Delaware, Dr. Brent Bechelheimer is trying to expose Nellie as a fraud, but she uses pictures of his gnoming hobby in order to portray him as unstable. 

Meanwhile, Amy is experiencing side effects that will soon kill her. As events progress, Nellie discovers that Jeffrey Callendar is experimenting on Fiske Cahill. In Tikal, Hamilton, Atticus, Ian, and Jonah try to find out if Amy and Dan have recovered Olivia's book, and try to find the riven crystal. 

Nellie tells Pony to warn Amy and Dan that they are heading into a trap. However, even though the riven crystal is found, Dan is abducted, Pony is killed by Pierce's thugs, and Nellie and Sammy are captured at Trilon Laboratories.

Flashpoint

The fourth and last book in the Unstoppable series, Flashpoint was written by Gordon Korman. The cover is purple, with green pieces of broken glass. The glass is shaped to form the symbols of the Cahill branches - Tomas, Janus, Ekaterina, Lucian, and Madrigal. However, at the end of the book, a note is attached that reads: "Sirs, The time has come to wake the dragon. X." The letter also has the Ekaterina branch symbol, which is a dragon.

The book begins with Dan Cahill, who was abducted by Cara and Galt Pierce. He thinks about the last twelve hours, in which great horrors took place. 

For example, Pierce was nearly elected president, Pony was killed trying to save Dan, and Amy only has a few more days to live due to the undiluted serum she took to save Dan. Galt and Cara Pierce, the children of J. Rutherford Pierce, begin to interrogate Dan by injecting him with sodium pentothal, or truth serum. They ask him about the antidote to the serum which Dan and the others are trying to create. 

Cara Pierce decides to leave Galt and Rutherford. Galt states how Pierce decoded Olivia Cahill's Household Book, which tells how to create the antidote. However, Dan retaliates by saying how Pierce "figured out our secret recipe for potato salad". By the end of the interrogation, they have confirmed that the last antidote ingredient is in Angkor, Cambodia. Angkor was one of the most developed societies of the ancient world. Dan inhales chloroform in order to pass out. 

Galt repeatedly wants to kill Dan, while Cara wants to keep him for further interrogation. Dan soon escapes, with the help of Cara. They plan to fly to Cambodia in order to thwart the Cahills' plans.

Doublecross

On April 26, 2014, at the New Hampshire Worlds Collide event, Scholastic announced a fourth series titled Doublecross. The series began with Jude Watson's Mission Titanic (2015), followed by C. Alexander London's Mission Hindenburg (2015) and Jenny Goebel's Mission Hurricane (2016). The series concludes with Sarwat Chadda's Mission Atomic published on June 28, 2016. Amy, Dan, and their allies try to thwart the Outcast's plans of mass destruction.

Mission Titanic 

Mission Titanic is the first book in the Doublecross series. It was written by Jude Watson, and published on February 24, 2015.

At only seventeen years old, Ian Kabra is head of the Cahills, the most powerful family in the world. He has presidents on speed dial and generals at his beck and call. Ian knows he's an ideal leader and the only man enough for the job.

There's just one small problem: He's already messed up big-time. A Cahill from the past calling himself the Outcast has risen to challenge Ian with an impossible test. The Outcast has re-created four of history's greatest disasters and dared Ian to stop him. If Ian and his allies can't decipher the Outcast's hints in time, innocent people will die. Ian's only chance to beat the Outcast is to track down his former allies, Amy and Dan.

But finding Amy and Dan will demand an impossible sacrifice from Ian.

Mission Hindenburg 

Mission Hindenburg is the second book in the Doublecross series. It was written by C. Alexander London, and published on July 28, 2015.

The Cahills are the world's most powerful family, but their strength is being tested. A sinister man calling himself The Outcast has targeted the family and set them an impossible test. He's recreating four of history's worst disasters and challenging the young Cahills to find and stop the tragedies before it's too late. Now, with one disaster behind them, siblings Dan and Amy Cahill and their friends have just days to discover what the Outcast's next move will be.

Their frantic search seems to be pointing toward a terrifying air disaster, the explosion of the Hindenburg airship. But no one travels by airship anymore—what do the Outcast's cryptic messages mean? The young Cahills must split up and take to the skies to try to find the answer . . . before their whole world comes crashing down.

Mission Hurricane 

Mission Hurricane is the third book in the Double-cross series. It was written by Jenny Goebel, and published on January 26, 2016.

Thirteen-year-old Dan Cahill and his older sister, Amy, know that a disaster is about to strike the world. They know they are the only ones who can stop it, and they know they may already be too late. The person behind the disaster is their own relative, a man who calls himself the Outcast. He's already re-created two of history's worst disasters, and is only biding his time before he strikes again.

The clues that the Cahill kids have gathered suggest that the Outcast's latest disaster is modeled after Hurricane Katrina. But what city will he target? And how can anyone conjure up a hurricane? Dan and Amy have no answers and very little time to find them. All they can count on is a tidal wave of trouble coming, and only them to stand in its way.

Mission Atomic 

Mission Atomic is the fourth and final book in the Doublecross series. It was written by Sarwat Chadda, and published on June 28, 2016.

Thirteen-year-old Dan Cahill and his older sister, Amy, are running out of time. An exiled Cahill known as the Outcast has already recreated three of history's worst disasters, and he's saved the worst for last. If Dan and Amy can't find and stop the Outcast fast, he will initiate a full-scale nuclear meltdown.

But as Dan and Amy race around the world, they discover something horrifying. The Outcast's disasters are only a smokescreen to cover up his true plan, a diabolical revenge on the family that betrayed him. Soon Amy and Dan will have to confront a hard truth: Sometimes the only way to save the world is to sacrifice everything you love. The book begins with the gang in Ian's apartment in London. The group decides to split up to fight the Outcast. First, Dan, Sammy, and Nellie will head to the Black Forest in Germany to check out one of the Outcast's former labs. Meanwhile, Amy, Jonah, and Hamilton will head to Shanghai, China, to look into an exposition with many Ekats in attendance while Cara and Ian head to Ukraine to look into the Chernobyl disaster.

Superspecial
Superspecial is the fifth and final series in The 39 Clues franchise. The series consists of only one standalone novel.

Outbreak

Outbreak is the only book in the Superspecial series, and the final book in The 39 Clues franchise. It was written by C. Alexander London and published on September 27, 2016.

Sinead Starling has returned, and has brought with her a plague which she has released in Havana. Amy and Dan are tasked with bringing her in, but discover she's only a pawn. The three escape Havana, fleeing to the Ekat stronghold in the Bermuda Triangle. While Sinead works on a cure, enemies from all sides converge on the Cahills. Amy succeeds in curing her friends, then gets the cure distributed to infected individuals across the world.

Characters
The books follow the adventures of Amy and Dan Cahill, two siblings from Massachusetts.

Supplementary works
Scholastic has expanded the 39 Clues universe with several books. In 2010, Scholastic published Agent Handbook, which explores the techniques that the clue hunters in the series use to find clues, and The Black Book of Buried Secrets, which provides more information about events in the series. In the last week of December 2011, the Scholastic editorial team released seven short stories as part of The 39 Clues: Rapid Fire e-book series. The editorial team has also released "The Cahill Files", which includes Operation Trinity, Spymasters, and four e-books. As part of the multimedia interactive experience to promote the series, Scholastic includes six cards in each book of the 39 Clues series. Each card leads to one online clue, which readers can unlock by entering the code on the cards on their 39 Clues account online.

Cards
The 39 Clues uses collectible cards to expand readers' experience of the series. In the first series of books, The Clue Hunt, each book came with six game cards. These cards all shared the same code and once added online would unlock the clue in that book. Alongside the first series of books, Card Packs were sold. These card packs contained 16 random cards out of a total of roughly 50 that were not available in the books. The card packs were:

In the second series, each book again came with six cards. However, unlike the first series, the cards were needed to unlock the online missions. Cahills vs. Vespers also had two card packs. These card packs all contained the same 16 game cards, which would unlock the online extreme missions. The card packs were:

In the third series Unstoppable, each book contains six game cards. These cards unlock an extra game in their corresponding online missions.

In the fourth series Doublecross, each book will contain six virtual cards.

Overall, the cards form a key part of the series. Players on the online website can only collect all the clues through the use of the cards, and in later series can only unlock the missions by having the cards. The cards in the first series often had puzzles and riddles to solve.

Additional cards have been released over the course of the series, and the cards are only virtual. Scholastic developed a game involving the cards, Doublecross, in which players physically use their cards to battle their opponents.

Themes
The 39 Clues series consists of adventure novels; however, the novels also fall within the genre of historical fiction. The stories switch back and forth between different characters' points of view. Each novel focuses on one historical figure and geographical location as Dan and Amy explore a clue related to a prominent Cahill family member in an exotic location.

One theme of the series is the relationship between talent and success. Each branch of the Cahill family has specific talents in a certain area; for example, the Ekaterina branch specializes in inventions and technology, the Tomas branch in Athleticism and Strength, the Lucians in Strategy and Politics, and Janus in Art and Music. Amy and Dan's competitors' talents give them an advantage, yet Amy and Dan consistently are ahead in the hunt and are viewed as the main threats. Over the course of the books, Amy and Dan discover their own talents.

Origins
An editorial team in Scholastic came up with the idea of an interactive series with online games and asked Rick Riordan to write the first book. Riordan agreed because he thought it was a good idea, and as a middle school teacher he loved making history enjoyable for younger readers. The project was kept secret for about two years.

Reception

Awards
As of June 11, 2010, The 39 Clues series had been on the New York Times bestseller list of Children's Series books for 48 weeks. Books in the series have also appeared on the USA Today, Publishers Weekly, and Wall Street Journal bestseller lists.

Critical reception

Critical reception of the 39 Clues has been mostly positive. The first book was met with positive reviews and spawned optimism for the rest of the series. The books have been very popular among kids.

Film
A film based on the series was originally planned, to be released in 2014. Steven Spielberg acquired film rights to the series in June 2008 and both Spielberg and Scholastic Media president Deborah Forte were to produce it, while Brett Ratner expressed interest in directing the first film in the series, and screenwriter Jeff Nathanson was hired to write the script in September 2008. Later, in May 2012, Shawn Levy, the director of the Night at the Museum movies, acquired the rights to direct the movie. The movie rights were then taken by Universal, in August 2013.  

However, the project appears to have been abandoned, as the latest information on it dates from 2014, and production has still not yet began.

See also

 Infinity Ring

References

External links

 
 Scholastic Plans to Put Its Branding Iron on a Successor to Harry Potter

 
Book series introduced in 2008
Scholastic franchises
Series of children's books
Scholastic Corporation books
Card games introduced in 2009
Young adult novel series
Online games
Collaborative fiction